HMS Vittoria was a British destroyer of the Admiralty V-class. She was converted to a minelayer, and was torpedoed by the Bolshevik submarine Pantera off the island of Seiskari in the Gulf of Finland on 31 August 1919.

The sunken destroyer was given to the state of Finland on 12 December 1919 together with her sister ship ; however, when salvaging began in 1925, it was found that both ships were broken in two and impossible to repair.

In November 2013, divers rediscovered the wreck of the sunken destroyer at a depth of 30 meters (98 feet).

Notes

Bibliography

External links
Photograph of  HMS Vittoria, circa 1918
Затопленный российской подлодкой британский эсминец нашли на дне Финского залива 

 

1917 ships
Allied intervention in the Russian Civil War
Maritime incidents in 1919
Ships built by Swan Hunter
Ships sunk by Soviet submarines
Shipwrecks in the Gulf of Finland
Soviet Union–United Kingdom relations
Ships built on the River Tyne
V and W-class destroyers of the Royal Navy
World War I destroyers of the United Kingdom